Blanca Eppen Canales (born 13 April 1950) is a Mexican politician affiliated with the National Action Party. As of 2014 she served as Deputy of the LIX Legislature of the Mexican Congress in a proportional representation.

References

1950 births
Living people
Politicians from Torreón
Women members of the Chamber of Deputies (Mexico)
Members of the Chamber of Deputies (Mexico)
National Action Party (Mexico) politicians
21st-century Mexican politicians
21st-century Mexican women politicians
Deputies of the LIX Legislature of Mexico